Zoran Mijanović (born 5 Jun 1974 in Novi Sad, Yugoslavia) is a Serbian football player who is goalkeeping coach at Buriram United in Thailand since June 2017.

Career
Mijanovic is one of Nybergsund's most experienced players. He made his debut for FK Vojvodina in 1992 before moving first to Sporting Farense in 1998, then to Legia Warsaw in 2002, Bihor Oradea in 2004, Sporting Olhanense in 2006, FK Bežanija in January 2008, Nybergsund IL in August 2008 FK Metalac in July 2009 and then returning to Nybergsund in July 2010;  he retired from playing football/been a keeper since 2013.

References

 Profile at Srbijafudbal.

External links
 Stats at Utakmica.rs
 
 

1974 births
Living people
Footballers from Novi Sad
Serbian footballers
Association football goalkeepers
FK Vojvodina players
FC Bihor Oradea players
FK Bežanija players
FK Sloboda Užice players
Serbian SuperLiga players
Expatriate footballers in Romania
S.C. Olhanense players
S.C. Farense players
Expatriate footballers in Portugal
Expatriate footballers in Norway
Legia Warsaw players
Expatriate footballers in Poland
Serbian expatriate sportspeople in Poland